Jonathan Stock (born January 2, 1983) is a German journalist and staff writer for Der Spiegel magazine. Stock studied European history at University College London. After graduating, he attended the Henri Nannen School of Journalism. Before joining Der Spiegel in 2012, he contributed as a freelancer for the German television broadcaster ZDF and the weekly newspaper Die Zeit. He covered the Libyan crisis and civil war, the Syrian civil war and the war in Afghanistan. Stock's work has been awarded with several major German prizes in journalism.

References

External links

1983 births
Living people
German journalists
German male journalists
German male writers
Der Spiegel people